Mandanda is a Congolese surname especially bore by a French-Congolese professional football goalkeeper's siblings with :
Steve Mandanda (born 1985), French national team and Olympique de Marseille (French Ligue 1) goalkeeper
Parfait Mandanda (born 1989), Congolese national team and Hartford Athletic (USL Championship) goalkeeper
Riffi Mandanda (born 1992), Stade Rennais (French Ligue 1) third goalkeeper
 Over Mandanda (born 1998), US Créteil-Lusitanos (French Championnat National 2) reserve team goalkeeper.

Bantu-language surnames